Eileen Dietz is an American actress who is best known for her appearances in many horror films such as the face of the demon in The Exorcist and for her portrayal of characters on the soap operas Guiding Light and General Hospital.

Early life and career
As a child, Dietz appeared in commercials with her twin sister Marianne DeFossey, and beginning at the age of 12 she started studying acting at the Neighborhood Playhouse. She made her television debut in 1963 in a small guest role on The Doctors. Shortly thereafter she landed a recurring role on the soap opera Love of Life. She made her film debut starring in the 1966 movie Teenage Gang Debs as Ellie. The following year she portrayed Penny Wohl in the critically acclaimed independent film David Holzman's Diary. The film never got much in the way of theatrical distribution despite having Dietz's nude scene featured in Life Magazine's photo spread and in the book of the film. She did not recall if she auditioned for the role of Penny but she added, "it was a fun shoot."

Dietz spent much of the late 1960s and early 1970s appearing in theatre productions. She notably appeared Off-Broadway as the Young Girl in the premiere of Bruce Jay Friedman's Steambath at the Truck and Warehouse Theater in 1970. In 1972, she portrayed an androgynous runaway in the premiere of Joyce Carol Oates' Ontological Proof of My Existence. Her portrayal in the play led to an invitation to do a screen test for The Exorcist. She was cast in two memorable roles in the film: Pazuzu the demon (better known as the face of death), and the 'possessed Regan' (the Linda Blair character). She performed in scenes that were too violent or disturbing for Blair to perform, including the crucifix scene and the fistfight with Father Karras.

After The Exorcist, Dietz had a highly active career on television during the 1970s, appearing as a guest star on such shows as Planet of the Apes, Korg: 70,000 B.C., Barnaby Jones, and Happy Days among others. She also portrayed the recurring role of Linette Waterman in the soap opera The Guiding Light and appeared in the films You Light Up My Life (1977) and Parts: The Clonus Horror (1979).

In 1980, Dietz joined the cast of General Hospital as Sarah Abbott, a role she played for several years. She also appeared as a guest star on Trapper John, M.D. (1982) and in the horror film Freeway Maniac (1989). More recent film credits include Naked in the Cold Sun (1997), Hurricane Festival (1997), Bad Guys (2000), Exorcism (2003), The Mojo Cafe (2004), Neighborhood Watch (2005), Constantine (2005), Karla (2006), Creepshow III (2006), Dog Lover's Symphony (2006), and Tracing Cowboys (2008).

Dietz appeared as Winnie Gilmore in Halloween II (2009) in an uncredited role.

Dietz was cast in the thriller Eden Falls, co-written by Victor Miller, creator of Friday the 13th, and then slated for a 2017 release. However, the project was still in development.

Personal life
Dietz has been married to Thomas Albany since March 1984.

Filmography

References

External links
 
 
 

Living people
American film actresses
American stage actresses
American television actresses
Neighborhood Playhouse School of the Theatre alumni
People from Queens, New York
Actresses from New York (state)
21st-century American women
Year of birth missing (living people)